Brendan Edward Hassett is an American mathematician who works as a professor of mathematics at Brown University. His research interests include algebraic geometry and number theory.

Hassett graduated from Yale College in 1992, and earned his doctorate in 1996 from Harvard University under the supervision of Joe Harris. After temporary positions at the Mittag-Leffler Institute, University of Chicago, and Chinese University of Hong Kong, he joined the Rice University faculty in 2000. He was promoted to full professor in 2006, chaired the department from 2009 to 2014, and was named as the Milton Brockett Porter Professor of Mathematics in 2013. In July 2015 he moved to Brown University.  He is currently the Director of the Institute for Computational and Experimental Research in Mathematics.

Hassett is the author of the textbook Introduction to Algebraic Geometry (Cambridge University Press, 2007).

In 2013, Hassett was named as a fellow of the American Mathematical Society "for contributions to higher-dimensional arithmetic geometry and birational geometry."

References

External links
Home page
Google scholar profile

Year of birth missing (living people)
Living people
20th-century American mathematicians
21st-century American mathematicians
Algebraic geometers
Number theorists
Yale University alumni
Harvard University alumni
Rice University faculty
Fellows of the American Mathematical Society
Brown University faculty